Cypripedium henryi, Henry's cypripedium, is a species of orchid endemic to China. It is found in southern Gansu, Guizhou, western  Hubei, southern Shaanxi, southern Shanxi, Sichuan, and northwestern to southeastern Yunnan.

References

henryi
Endemic orchids of China
Plants described in 1892